Euan Kennedy (born 30 July 1954 in Edinburgh, Scotland) is a former Scotland international rugby union player.

Rugby Union career

Amateur career

He played for Watsonians.

Provincial career

He played for Edinburgh District; and was part of the 1986–87 Scottish Inter-District Championship winning side.

He played for the Reds Trial side in their match against Blues Trial on 3 January 1987.

International career

He was capped by Scotland 'B', both times against France 'B', in 1976 and 1981.

He was capped for Scotland 4 times, scoring 1 try; against England at Murrayfield. He was part of 1984 Scotland team that won the Grand Slam of the Five Nations Championship.

Administrative career

He was a committee member of Watsonians at the time when the club entered the Super 6.

He became the President of Watsonians in 2019, a position previously held in the past by his father.

References

1954 births
Living people
Edinburgh District (rugby union) players
Reds Trial players
Rugby union players from Edinburgh
Scotland 'B' international rugby union players
Scotland international rugby union players
Scottish rugby union players
Watsonians RFC players
Rugby union centres